Selivanovsky is a rural locality (a village) in Davletovsky Selsoviet, Abzelilovsky District, Bashkortostan, Russia. The population was 188 as of 2010. There are 9 streets.

Geography 
Selivanovsky is located 18 km northeast of Askarovo (the district's administrative centre) by road. Davletovo is the nearest rural locality.

References 

Rural localities in Abzelilovsky District